The 2000–01 season was the 95th season in the history of Sporting Clube de Portugal and the club's 67th consecutive season in the top flight of Portuguese football.

Competitions

Overall record

Primeira Liga

League table

Results summary

Results by round

Matches

Taça de Portugal

Supertaça Cândido de Oliveira

UEFA Champions League

Group stage

References 

Sporting CP seasons
Sporting CP